Zakirov or Zokirov is a Central Asian masculine surname, its feminine counterpart is Zakirova or Zokirova. Notable people with the surname include:

Alexander Zakirov (born 1992), Russian ice hockey player
Botir Zokirov (1936–1985), Uzbek singer, painter and actor
Farrukh Zokirov (born 1946), Uzbek singer
Ghali Zakirov (1910–1944), Soviet soldier
Jamshid Zokirov (1948–2012), Uzbek film and theater actor
Kamila Zakirova (born 1992), Kazakhstani water polo player 
Marat Zakirov (born 1973), Russian water polo player
Nematjan Zakirov (born 1962), Kyrgyzstani footballer
Qodir Zokirov (1906–1992), Uzbek botanist and educator 
Rustam Zakirov (born 1989), Kyrgyzstani footballer
Sanjar Zokirov (born 1983), Uzbek judoka
Timur Zakirov (disambiguation)